Azad Maidan is a martyrs' monument and ground in the Indian state of Panaji, Goa. It is located opposite the Goa Police headquarters on the Mahatma Gandhi Road, Panaji.

History
Originally built as a square, it was known as the Praça de Sete Janelas (Square of the Seven Windows). The name was derived from the iconic Goa Police headquarters building, which has seven windows each to its either ends and the entrance. The building originally had a ground floor and three sets of seven windows each on the first floor. In 1843, a statue of the legendary Portuguese general Afonso de Albuquerque was laid inside the domed structure at the Maidan. It is said that the iron beams and granite pillars for the monuments were brought from the Convent of S. Domingos, Velha Goa. The pillars and columns for the dome came from the College of St. Thomas Aquinas, located on a hillock of Conceição. After Albuquerque's statue was installed, the square came to be known as Praça Afonso de Albuquerque.

Post liberation
After the Annexation of Goa, the statue of Albuquerque was removed from the domed pedestal by a mob of Marathi immigrants in the city. Albuquerque's statue was transferred to the Archaeological Survey of India Museum at Old Goa. A  brass urn containing the mortal remains of Tristão de Bragança Cunha was subsequently installed in its place.

Martyrs' Memorial
A martyrs' memorial was built at the Maidan by the Freedom Fighters' Association with public donations, in memory of those who sacrificed their lives in the Goa liberation movement. The memorial is a tall structure with a crest displaying a forum-armed structure. The four-armed structure has a pyramid between and atop these arms. The four-armed structure acknowledges the participation of freedom fighters from the four corners of India in the  Goa liberation movement, while the pyramid structure indicates ashes, indicating the sacrifice of these freedom fighters. The memorial was unveiled on 23 March 1973 by Lieutenant general Kunhiraman Palat Candeth, who had led the Indian Armed Forces' annexation of Goa in December 1961. A stanza composed by the poet Balakrishna Bhagwant Borkar has been etched on the memorial as follows:

 धन्य लोहिया, धन्य भूमी ही
 धन्य तिचे पुत्र
 धन्य तयाचा त्याग देखते 
 जनतेचे नेत्र
which translated as Fortunate are the eyes, which saw the sacrifices of its brave sons, brave Ram Manohar Lohia for its lands. On the either side of this monument are two rectangular pillars which display the name of 67 freedom fighters of the  Goa liberation movement.

Every year on national days, dignitaries pay homage by laying a wreath at the memorial and observing silence.

The Maidan today
In the modern times, the Maidan has become a melting pot for the Goans, where different opinions were voiced and issues discussed openly.

The grounds are used for holding meetings and protests.

References

Tourist attractions in Panaji
Buildings and structures in Panaji
Martyrs' monuments and memorials
Monuments and memorials in Goa